The New York Communist Club was a communist organisation set up in New York City in 1857. It was particularly active in the abolitionist struggle, leading it to become inactive during the American Civil War, as so many of its members were in the Union Army.

Friedrich Sorge, Albert Komp and Abraham Jacobi were involved in forming the organisation. The Club adopted as a fundamental principle that "every [doctrine] not founded on the perception of concrete objects" should be rejected.  They also stated: "We recognize no distinction as to nationality or race, caste, or status, color, or sex; our goal is but reconciliation of all human interests, freedom, and happiness for mankind, and the realization and unification of a world republic."

In 1867 the New York Communist Club affiliated as Section 1 of the International Workingmen's Association.

References

Communism in the United States
Organizations based in New York City
1857 establishments in New York (state)